Brackish marshes develop from salt marshes where a significant freshwater influx dilutes the seawater to brackish levels of salinity. This commonly happens upstream from salt marshes by estuaries of coastal rivers or near the mouths of coastal rivers with heavy freshwater discharges in the conditions of low tidal ranges.

Characteristics 
The salinity levels in brackish marshes can range from 0.5 ppt to 35 ppt. Marshes are also characterised by low-growing vegetation and bare mud or sand flats. Due to the variations in salinity, brackish marshes create a distinctive ecosystem where plants from either freshwater or saltwater marshes can co-inhabit. The salinity levels also change with the tides, decreasing at low tide and increasing at high tide as ocean water feeds farther upriver.

Ecosystem Services 

 Reduces coastline erosion
 Provides a coastal buffer from storms
 Mitigates flooding
 Filters and stores excess nitrogen from runoff water
 Provides habitats for aquatic organisms
 Coastal wetlands sequester more carbon than any other environment

Biodiversity 
In terms of biodiversity, a brackish marsh serves a unique ecological niche. Its vegetation is a byproduct of its salinity levels. High salinity serves as an evolutionary barrier for most plants, creating a less diverse number of plant species as an ecosystem moves from fresh to saltwater. Thus, there are only a few colonies of saltwater native plants in freshwater and almost no freshwater plants in saltwater ecosystems. However, in brackish marshes both types of plants are prevalent and are in fact high in plant productivity. Examples include, arrow arum (Peltandra virginica), soft rush (Juncus effusus), cattail (Typha), and sawgrass (Cladium).

These plants are usually halophytic in order to survive these conditions. For example brackish sites in Georgia, U.S., are dominated by species such as smooth cord grass (Sporobolus alterniflora), big cordgrass (Spartina cynosuroides), and black rush (Juncus roemerianus). Other communities are cabbage palm (Sabal palmetto), sand cordgrass (Spartina bakeri), black rush (Juncus roemerianus), saltgrass (Distichlis spicata, Paspalum distichum), and mixed halophytes (Batis maritima, Salicomia virginica). Along with salinity, brackish marshes face high physical stress due to flooding and wave currents creating adaptive traits within the plant community.

These plant communities also create an environment that provides a nursery for juvenile fish, crustaceans, and birds. Fauna use the shallow habitat and the turbidity of the water to protect themselves from predators. Similarly the surface of the marsh is covered with vegetation which is used by the nekton species for shelter, leaving enough space to move underneath between the stems. 

The trophic levels within a brackish marsh has been shown to depend on the amount of macro organic matter in the upper level of soil. This macro organic matter is believed to be the food source of detritivore benthic animals that support higher trophic levels. These materials build up as the marsh matures, making age another factor in the biodiversity of a brackish marsh.

Human use and impacts 
Brackish marshes are very important for flood control. However, they are often subject to heavy pollution and habitat degradation from land reclamation. For example, the Indian River Lagoon has suffered significant man-made changes since the 1940s. Marshes were often dredged or impounded to prevent mosquitoes, however this led to the disruption of connectivity by replacing marshes with open water. These changes prevented fires that allowed invasive species to move into the remaining marshes.

Brackish marsh environments are especially susceptible to human degradation; they are ideal areas for land conversion and development because they aren’t rocky and tend to be located in temperate coastal regions. Brackish marshes are areas that can provide connections for both land and water access.

There are many ways humans have disrupted and degraded brackish marshes. When humans divert water from these marshes it leads to land sinking, also known as subsidence. Humans have also modified the vegetation of brackish marshes to change water and sediment flow.  Brackish marshes have been subjected to an overabundance of nutrients and pollutants from industrial and urban sources. Environmental stressors from human impact have changed brackish marsh biodiversity to mainly stress-tolerant invasive grasses. Additionally, negative consequences of climate change, such as sea level rise, will likely begin to harm brackish marsh ecosystems.

Brackish marshes can be restored by human intervention. Studies have found that given that restoration is properly carried out, fish do not discriminate between restored or natural marshes.

Conservation and threats 
As in most habitats, the greatest threat towards brackish marshes are humans. Traditionally, direct human activities such as dredging and development are the main cause of destruction. Pollution has also been a threat to brackish marshes through chemical run-off. Once degraded, it could take at least 30 to 90 years for restored marsh soil to become equivalent to a natural marsh in terms of nitrogen and organic carbon profile. In some cases, these process could take over 200 years to achieve the wetland soil characteristics of certain communities. 

For conservation, the key is to restrict human activities. Installing a passive management system could help restore certain species using brackish marshes' role as an ecological nursery. For some areas, periodic livestock grazing could help create a better habitat for certain species of birds. Brackish marshes are a unique type of wetland and the local circumstances are paramount to consider for either conservation, biodiversity, or restoration.

See also

Tidal marsh

References

Coastal geography
Salt marshes
Marine biology